Fernando Villalpando Domínguez (born 2 September 1996) is a Mexican footballer who plays as a forward for  CD Walter Ferretti. Pertenece a la agencia de Representación Aspisal Sports Developments

A native of Juchipila, Villalpando began playing youth football with Deportivo Toluca F.C., eventually training with the club's senior side. After a career playing in the lower levels of Mexican club football, Villalpando moved to Nicaragua where he led the league in scoring.

References

1996 births
Living people
Mexican footballers
Association football forwards
Mineros de Zacatecas players
Tuxtla F.C. footballers
Ascenso MX players
Liga Premier de México players
Footballers from Zacatecas